Paka is a dispersed settlement in the Municipality of Vitanje in northeastern Slovenia. The area is part of the traditional region of Styria. It lies in the hills north of Vitanje. It is now included with the rest of the municipality in the Savinja Statistical Region.

References

External links
Paka at Geopedia

Populated places in the Municipality of Vitanje